East Horizon Airlines was an Afghan regional airline.

History
The airline began operations in December 2013. As of May 2014 the airline had regularly scheduled flights to nine airports from its hubs at Herat and Kabul airports. As of September 2018, the airline suspended all operations.

Destinations
As of May 2014 the airline served the following destinations:

Fleet
As of May 2014 the East Horizon Airlines fleet consisted of the following aircraft:

References

Defunct airlines of Afghanistan
Airlines established in 2013
Airlines disestablished in 2018
Airlines formerly banned in the European Union
2013 establishments in Afghanistan
2010s disestablishments in Afghanistan